Huhanye, born Jihoushan, was a Chanyu of the Xiongnu Empire, the son of Xulüquanqu Chanyu. He rebelled in 59 BC with the aid of Wushanmu and Woyanqudi Chanyu soon committed suicide, leaving the Xiongnu torn apart by factional strife. By 55 BC, only Huhanye and his brother Zhizhi Chanyu were left.

Family 
Parents:
Father: Xulüquanqu Chanyu
Mother: Unknown
Brother: Woyanqudi Chanyu
Wives
Lady Da Yanzhi (大阏氏)
Fuzhulei Ruodi Chanyu (复株絫若鞮单于; r 31–20 BC)
Souxie Chanyu (搜谐单于; r. 20–12 BC)
Wulei Chanyu  (乌累若鞮单于; r.13–18 AD)
Prince Xian of Zuo (左贤王)
Lady Zhuanqu Yanzhi (颛渠阏氏)
Juya Chanyu (车牙单于; r.12–8 B.C)
Wuzhuliu Chanyu (乌珠留单; r.8 BC–13 AD)
Lady Tuqi Yanzhi (屠耆阏氏)
Prince Xian of You (右贤王)
Lady Diwu Yanzhi (第五阏氏)
Huduershidaogao Chanyu (呼都而尸道皋若鞮单于)
Lady Wang Zhaojun (王昭君)
Prince Yituzhiyashi (伊屠智牙師)
 Another Prince
Princess Subu Juci  (须卜居次)
Princess Dangyu Juci (当于居次)

Biography
In 33 BC, Huhanye visited Chang'an as part of the tributary system that existed between the Han and Xiongnu governments. He took the opportunity to request to become an imperial son-in-law and unwilling to honour Huhanye with a real princess, Emperor Yuan ordered that the plainest girl in the harem be selected. A lady-in-waiting named Wang Zhaojun volunteered and the Emperor approved. However, Wang Zhaojun was revealed to be exceedingly beautiful and she is considered one of the Four Beauties of ancient China, alongside Xi Shi, Diaochan, and Yang Guifei. 

Wang Zhaojun became a favorite of Huhanye Chanyu, giving birth to two sons. Only one, Yituzhiyashi (伊屠智牙師) has been recorded as survived, and Yituzhiyazhi was involved in politics. They also had two daughters, Yun (雲) known as Subu Juci (须卜居次) and Dangyu Juci (当于居次). Yun was created Princess Yimuo and would later become a powerful figure in Xiongnu politics.

Huhanye was defeated by Zhizhi in 51 BC and fled to the Han dynasty. Zhizhi also submitted to the Han the following year but declared independence in 48 BC once he saw that they favored his brother. Zhizhi moved further west to attack Fergana and the Wusun. In 43 BC, Huhanye moved back north. Zhizhi was killed by the Han at the Battle of Zhizhi in 36 BC, leaving Huhanye the uncontested leader of the Xiongnu. Huhanye died in 31 BC and was succeeded by his son Diaotaomogao.

Footnotes

References

Bichurin N.Ya., "Collection of information on peoples in Central Asia in ancient times", vol. 1, Sankt Petersburg, 1851, reprint Moscow-Leningrad, 1950

Taskin B.S., "Materials on Sünnu history", Science, Moscow, 1968, p. 31 (In Russian)

Chanyus
1st-century BC rulers in Asia
31 BC deaths